Leptodeuterocopus trinidad is a moth of the family Pterophoridae that is known from Trinidad and Venezuela.

Adults are on wing from January to March.

External links

Deuterocopinae
Moths described in 1996
Moths of South America